Paolo Longo Borghini (born 10 December 1980 in Asiago) is an Italian former professional road bicycle racer.

Longo Borghini is the son of three-time cross-country skiing Olympian Guidina Dal Sasso. His younger sister Elisa Longo Borghini is also a racing cyclist.

Major results

2001
 3rd Trophée des Alpes de la Mer
2002
 3rd Trofeo Alcide Degasperi
2003
 7th Trofeo Gianfranco Bianchin
2006
 1st Gran Premio Nobili Rubinetterie
 7th Giro del Veneto
2007
 8th Overall Tour Down Under
 9th GP Industria & Artigianato di Larciano
2008
 5th Grand Prix de Denain

Grand Tour general classification results timeline

References

External links 

 

1980 births
Living people
People from Asiago
Italian male cyclists
Cyclists from the Province of Vicenza